2016 Belarusian First League was the 26th season of 2nd level football in Belarus. It started in April and finished in November 2016.

Team changes from 2015 season
Three best teams of 2015 Belarusian First League (Gorodeya, Isloch Minsk Raion and Krumkachy Minsk) were promoted to Belarusian Premier League. They were replaced by last-placed team of 2015 Belarusian Premier League table (Gomel).

Rechitsa-2014, who finished 16th last year, relegated to the Second League. To compensate for Premier League expansion, they were replaced by three best teams of 2015 Second League (Luch Minsk, Uzda and Torpedo Minsk).

Before the start of the season Bereza-2010 disbanded, while Kobrin and newly promoted Uzda did not receive First League license and were denied participation. Oshmyany, who finished 5th in 2015 Second League, were additionally promoted, while no other Second League club eligible for extra promotion applied for the license. As a result, the league was reduced to 14 clubs for 2016 season.

Teams summary

League table

Results

Top goalscorers

Updated to games played on 6 November 2016 Source: football.by

See also
2016 Belarusian Premier League
2015–16 Belarusian Cup
2016–17 Belarusian Cup

External links
 Official site 

Belarusian First League seasons
2
Belarus
Belarus